The Taça Oswaldo Cruz (English: Oswaldo Cruz Cup), was a football tournament played between the national teams of Brazil and Paraguay, and contested from 1950 to 1976, albeit irregularly. It was organised by the Brazilian Sports Confederation and the Paraguayan Football Association with the purpose of promoting sporting exchange between the two countries.

The trophy was named after Oswaldo Cruz, a Brazilian physician, pioneer bacteriologist and epidemiologist, and founder of the Oswaldo Cruz Institute.

The competition was played in a two-legged format, with all the editions being won by Brazil. From a total of 16 matches in 8 editions contested, Brazil won 11, with Paraguay only winning once.

List of Champions

Titles

See also 
 Oswaldo Cruz

References

Brazil national football team matches
Paraguay national football team matches
International association football competitions hosted by Brazil
International association football competitions hosted by Paraguay
Defunct international association football competitions in South America